This is a list of places in Albania which have standing links to local communities in other countries known as "town twinning" (usually in Europe) or "sister cities" (usually in the rest of the world).

B
Berat

 Amasya, Turkey
 Bağcılar, Turkey
 Bérat, France
 Fermo, Italy
 Karmiel, Israel
 Lovech, Bulgaria
 Ploiești, Romania
 Prizren, Kosovo
 Ulcinj, Montenegro

D
Dropull
 Trikala, Greece

Durrës

 Bari, Italy
 Bitonto, Italy
 Istanbul, Turkey
 Thessaloniki, Greece
 Ulcinj, Montenegro

E
Elbasan

 Dunaújváros, Hungary
 Osijek, Croatia

F
Fier

 Cleveland, United States
 Lanzhou, China
 Peja, Kosovo

G
Gjirokastër

 Grottammare, Italy
 Patras, Greece

Gramsh
 Plataci, Italy

K
Kamëz

 Castenaso, Italy
 Macerata, Italy

Kavajë
 Saronikos, Greece

Korçë

 Los Alcázares, Spain
 Cluj-Napoca, Romania
 Mitrovica, Kosovo
 Thessaloniki, Greece

Krujë

 Cortona, Italy
 Portocannone, Italy
 Stari Grad (Sarajevo), Bosnia and Herzegovina

Kuçovë
 Ramla, Israel

Kukës
 Lyndhurst, United States

P
Përmet
 Rahovec, Kosovo

Pogradec

 Ohrid, North Macedonia
 Wismar, Germany

Pukë
 Signa, Italy

S
Sarandë

 Corfu, Greece
 Gjilan, Kosovo
 Larnaca, Cyprus
 Otranto, Italy
 Riccione, Italy
 Stavroupoli, Greece
 Suhareka, Kosovo

Shkodër

 Cetinje, Montenegro
 Knin, Croatia
 Pécs, Hungary
 Üsküdar, Turkey
 Zeytinburnu, Turkey

T
Tirana

 Ankara, Turkey
 Beijing, China
 Bursa, Turkey
 Doha, Qatar
 Florence, Italy
 Kharkiv, Ukraine
 Sarajevo, Bosnia and Herzegovina
 Skopje, North Macedonia

V
Vlorë

 Hollywood, United States
 Yangzhou, China

References

Albania
Albania geography-related lists
Foreign relations of Albania
Cities in Albania
Populated places in Albania